Mordellistena batteni is a beetle in the genus Mordellistena of the family Mordellidae. It was described in 1980 by Horák.

References

batteni
Beetles described in 1980